Kalajabad (also Romanized as Kalajābād, Kallajābād, Kolejābād, and Koljābād; also known as Kalekh-Dzhava, Kollūjābād, Kolūchābād, Kolūjābād, Qal‘eh Jāwa, and Qal‘eh Jūq) is a village in Chavarzaq Rural District, Chavarzaq District, Tarom County, Zanjan Province, Iran. At the 2006 census, its population was 212, in 42 families.

References 

Populated places in Tarom County